Chesilhurst is a borough in Camden County, in the U.S. state of New Jersey. As of the 2020 United States census, the borough's population was 1,536, a decrease of 98 (−6.0%) from the 2010 census count of 1,634, which in turn reflected an increase of 114 (+7.5%) from the 1,520 counted in the 2000 census.

Chesilhurst was incorporated as a borough by an act of the New Jersey Legislature on November 26, 1887, from portions of Waterford Township and Winslow Township, based on the results of a referendum held on October 18, 1887.

New Jersey Monthly magazine ranked Chesilhurst last among the towns rated in its 2008 rankings of "Best Places to Live" in New Jersey (placing at # 566).

Geography
According to the U.S. Census Bureau, the borough had a total area of 1.72 square miles (4.45 km2), including 1.72 square miles (4.44 km2) of land and <0.01 square miles (<0.01 km2) of water (0.12%).

The borough borders both Waterford Township and Winslow Township.

Demographics

2020 census

Note: the US Census treats Hispanic/Latino as an ethnic category. This table excludes Latinos from the racial categories and assigns them to a separate category. Hispanics/Latinos can be of any race.

2010 census

The Census Bureau's 2006–2010 American Community Survey showed that (in 2010 inflation-adjusted dollars) median household income was $57,969 (with a margin of error of +/− $14,321) and the median family income was $76,406 (+/− $14,069). Males had a median income of $42,232 (+/− $4,747) versus $36,908 (+/− $6,544) for females. The per capita income for the borough was $24,646 (+/− $2,686). About 3.2% of families and 8.3% of the population were below the poverty line, including 6.8% of those under age 18 and 16.9% of those age 65 or over.

Government

Local government
Chesilhurst is governed under the Borough form of New Jersey municipal government, which is used in 218 municipalities (of the 564) statewide, making it the most common form of government in New Jersey. The governing body is comprised of a Mayor and a Borough Council, with all positions elected at-large on a partisan basis as part of the November general election. A Mayor is elected directly by the voters to a four-year term of office. The Borough Council is comprised of six members elected to serve three-year terms on a staggered basis, with two seats coming up for election each year in a three-year cycle. The Borough form of government used by Chesilhurst is a "weak mayor / strong council" government in which council members act as the legislative body with the mayor presiding at meetings and voting only in the event of a tie. The mayor can veto ordinances subject to an override by a two-thirds majority vote of the council. The mayor makes committee and liaison assignments for council members, and most appointments are made by the mayor with the advice and consent of the council.

, the Mayor of Chesilhurst is Democrat Jamila A. Odom-Garnett, whose term of office ends December 31, 2023. Members of the Borough Council are Council President Russell S. Hirn Sr. (D, 2022), Karen Chew (D, 2023), Cathleen Jordan (D, 2024), Monica Holmes (D, 2022), Pearlie C. Lee (D, 2024) and Maria C. Littles (D, 2023).

Federal, state, and county representation
Chesilhurst is located in the 1st Congressional District and is part of New Jersey's 4th state legislative district. Prior to the 2011 reapportionment following the 2010 Census, Chesilhurst had been in the 6th state legislative district.

Politics
As of March 2011, there were a total of 1,156 registered voters in Chesilhurst, of which 673 (58.2%) were registered as Democrats, 79 (6.8%) were registered as Republicans and 404 (34.9%) were registered as Unaffiliated. There were no voters registered to other parties.

In the 2012 presidential election, Democrat Barack Obama received 82.8% of the vote (629 cast), ahead of Republican Mitt Romney with 16.2% (123 votes), and other candidates with 1.1% (8 votes), among the 767 ballots cast by the borough's 1,250 registered voters (7 ballots were spoiled), for a turnout of 61.4%. In the 2008 presidential election, Democrat Barack Obama received 82.8% of the vote (657 cast), ahead of Republican John McCain, who received around 14.2% (113 votes), with 793 ballots cast among the borough's 1,241 registered voters, for a turnout of 63.9%. In the 2004 presidential election, Democrat John Kerry received 77.4% of the vote (518 ballots cast), outpolling Republican George W. Bush, who received around 19.4% (130 votes), with 669 ballots cast among the borough's 1,038 registered voters, for a turnout percentage of 64.5.

In the 2013 gubernatorial election, Democrat Barbara Buono received 64.2% of the vote (249 cast), ahead of Republican Chris Christie with 34.8% (135 votes), and other candidates with 1.0% (4 votes), among the 400 ballots cast by the borough's 1,240 registered voters (12 ballots were spoiled), for a turnout of 32.3%. In the 2009 gubernatorial election, Democrat Jon Corzine received 71.4% of the vote (314 ballots cast), ahead of both Republican Chris Christie with 23.2% (102 votes) and Independent Chris Daggett with 2.7% (12 votes), with 440 ballots cast among the borough's 1,161 registered voters, yielding a 37.9% turnout.

Education
The Chesilhurst Borough School District had served public school students in kindergarten through sixth grade at Shirley B. Foster Elementary School. After the completion of the 2008–2009 school year, the district was no longer operating any schools and began sending all of its students to the Winslow Township School District as part of a sending/receiving relationship that commenced in the 2009–10 school year.

Despite the fact that the district does not operate any school facilities, The district's board of education, with five members, sets policy and oversees the operation of the sending relationship. As a Type II school district, the board's trustees are elected directly by voters to serve three-year terms of office on a staggered basis, with either one or two seats up for election each year held (since 2012) as part of the November general election.

Transportation

Roads and highways

U.S. Route 30 is the main road serving Chesilhurst. CR 536 runs along the southern border briefly. The Atlantic City Expressway is accessible in neighboring Winslow Township.

Public transportation
NJ Transit local bus service is provided on the 554 route between the Lindenwold station and Atlantic City.

References

External links

 

 
1887 establishments in New Jersey
Borough form of New Jersey government
Boroughs in Camden County, New Jersey
Populated places established in 1887